Inhuman Resources is a 2020 French-language television miniseries based on the book Cadres Noirs by Pierre Lemaitre, starring Eric Cantona, Suzanne Clément and Alex Lutz.

Plot 
Alain Delambre (Eric Cantona) has been out of work for six years after his company downsized by firing all older employees. He finally receives an interview for the company Exxya. As part of the interview process, he is asked to ask questions as a hostage taker in a role playing game where the executives for Exxya will be held hostage. Alain does not know that the president of the company is using the exercise to figure out which of the executives will be best to handle a volatile situation after Exxya fires at least 2,500 employees at a factory. The executives think that the hostage situation is real. Alain steals money from his pregnant daughter and repeatedly lies to his family to train for the hostage scenario. Just before it is to begin, he is told that the position was already filled and he is only being included to demonstrate a diverse pool of candidates. In anger, Alain decides to make the scenario a real hostage taking.

Cast 
 Eric Cantona as Alain Delambre
 Suzanne Clément as Nicole Delambre
 Alex Lutz as Alexandre Dorfmann
 Gustave Kervern as Charles Bresson
 Alice de Lencquesaing as Lucie Delambre
 Louise Coldefy as Mathilde Delambre
 Adama Niane as David Fontana
 Aton as Antoine
 Soraya Garlenq as Yasmine
 Carlos Chahine as Paul Cousin
 Eurydice El-Etr as Clémentine Haddad
 Cyril Couton as Jean-Marie Guéneau
 Nicolas Martinez as Grégory Ziegler
 Xavier Robic as Bertrand Lacoste
 Clémence Bretécher as Stéphanie Gilson
 Aleksandra Yermak as Florence Ancelin
 Émilie Gavois-Kahn as the judge

Release 
Inhuman Resources was released on June 26, 2020 on Arte.

References

External links
 
 

French-language Netflix original programming
French television miniseries
2020 French television series debuts
2020 French television series endings
2020s French drama television series